The 1960 Syracuse Orangemen football team represented Syracuse University in the 1960 NCAA University Division football season. The Orangemen were led by 12th-year head coach Ben Schwartzwalder and played their home games at Archbold Stadium in Syracuse, New York. Syracuse finished the regular season with a record of 7–2 and ranked 19th in the AP Poll. The university administration ruled against accepting a bowl invite saying that the "season was long enough". They were not invited to a bowl game.

Junior halfback Ernie Davis continued to garner national attention, earning consensus All-American honors while rushing for 877 yards and 8 touchdowns.

Schedule

References

Syracuse
Syracuse Orange football seasons
Syracuse Orangemen football